Naanga is a 2012 Indian Tamil language film directed by Selva, featuring an ensemble cast of newcomers in the lead roles. The film, notably Selva's 25th directorial, revolves around a group of alumni from the 1985 batch of a Tiruchi College, who meet again in 2011. It was released on 9 March 2012.

Plot
Five college friends reunite after many years to help Devi, one of their friends who has woken up from a coma, get back with her lover, Babu.

Cast

 Nivas as Mani
 Vinod as Daya
 Sanjay Krishna as Chandran
 Uday as Babu
 Muneesh as Baasha
 Shakir
 Varun
 Virumandi
 Ashwin Raja
 Vishnupriya as Devi
 Shivani Bhai
 Vaidehi
 Arasi
 Kasthuri
 Raj Kapoor
 K. S. G. Venkatesh
 Lizzie Antony as Reporter
Chelladurai
Scissor Manohar
Raviraj

Production
For the lead roles in the film, Selva had cast children of noted film personalities; Sanjay Krishna, son of actor-director Santhana Bharathi, Nivas, actor Adithan's son, Muneesh, who was Telugu music composer Vasu Rao's son, production executive Gurusamy's son Vinod and film distributor Chandrasekhar's son Uday. The film's antagonist role was played by popular playback singer Mano's son Shakir, while producer V. Swaminathan's Ashwin Raja, who previously had appeared in the comedy entertainer Boss Engira Bhaskaran, played the comedian. Vishnu Priya, Shivani Bhai, Vaidehi and Arasi, who enacted the lead female characters, also made their debut in Tamil films, although the former two had starred in Malayalam films before. Former lead actress Kasthuri was roped in for a pivotal role.

Bala Bharathy and Balamurugan, who had been part of Selva's Amaravathi (1993), were signed on as the composer and cinematographer, respectively, rejoining with Selva after nearly twenty years. Selva introduced Raghavan Urs as the editor, son on Suresh Urs, himself a noted editor in Indian cinema.

Soundtrack
Soundtrack was composed by Balabharathi. Bala Bharathy composed eights songs for the film in the same ragas used by Ilaiyaraaja in the 1980s.
"Devadhaya" - Karthik 
"Adiye Pottapulla" - Solar Sai, Cimon 
"Muthamizhey" - Ravi, Anita Suresh 
"Enadhu Nenjilay" - Haricharan, Mumbai Sailaja Subramaniam 
"Idhazhil" - Karthik, Chinmayi
"Engay Engay" - Vijay Prakash, Mumbai Sailaja Subramaniam 
"Romance Rowdy" - Benny Dayal
"Kadhalanay" - Mumbai Sailaja Subramaniam

Reception
M Suganth from The Times of India gave 3 out of 5 and said: "While the broad strokes with which he paints this story let you get the rough feel of the film, "Naanga" doesn't really leave you wistful and yearning for a charming, not-so-distant past". The Hindu'''s critic Malathi Rangarajan in her review wrote: "A host of new faces, a fresh approach to narration, a rare storyline that gives equal importance to an entire group of friends — five in all — decent portrayals, a few clichés and a dose of melodrama comprise Selva's Naanga". A reviewer from Behindwoods.com gave the film 1.5 out 5, noting that it was an "episodic and disjointed affair which never really takes off". Indiaglitz.com cited: "Naanga'' promises aplenty. Selva has proved his worth yet again by narrating a feel-good story with rightly recreating the ambience and mood of 1980s". Rohit Ramachandran from Nowrunning.com rated the film 2 out of 5, while calling it an "honest failure".

References

2012 films
2010s Tamil-language films
Films directed by Selva (director)